Nathoon is a 1974 Indian Malayalam-language film, directed by K. Narayanan. The film stars Rani Chandra, Vincent, Sudheer and Bahadoor. The film has musical score by M. S. Baburaj.

Cast
Rani Chandra
Sudheer
Vincent
Adoor Bhasi
Thikkurissy Sukumaran Nair
Sankaradi
Sreelatha Namboothiri
Bahadoor
N. Govindankutty

Soundtrack
The music was composed by M. S. Baburaj and the lyrics were written by Sreekumaran Thampi.

References

External links
 

1974 films
1970s Malayalam-language films